is a Japanese professional footballer who currently plays as a defender for Hong Kong Premier League club Rangers. Besides Japan, he has played in Cambodia, Sri Lanka. and Hong Kong.

Club career

Before the 2018 season, Hayashi signed for Cambodian side Angkor Tiger. In 2019, he left Angkor Tiger.

Before the 2021 season, he signed for Sea Hawks FC in Sri Lanka.

In November 2021, he signed for Hong Kong Premier League club Rangers. On 20 November 2021, Hayashi debuted for the club during a 3–3 draw with RCFC.

References

External links
 Ryota Hayashi at HKFA

Japanese footballers
Living people
1995 births
Association football defenders
Hong Kong Rangers FC players
Expatriate footballers in Sri Lanka
Expatriate footballers in Hong Kong
Japanese expatriate sportspeople in Cambodia
Japanese expatriate sportspeople in Hong Kong
Angkor Tiger FC players
Japanese expatriate footballers
Sri Lanka Football Premier League players
Hong Kong Premier League players
Expatriate footballers in Cambodia